7 Burlington Gardens is a Grade II* building in Mayfair, London. Formerly known as Queensberry House, it was later called Uxbridge House. The building was home to the London flagship store of the American fashion retailer Abercrombie & Fitch.

Location
The address is in the Mayfair district of London. Although the official address is "7 Burlington Gardens", it is also on Savile Row and Google Maps labels the location as "42 Savile Row, Westminster". On the side of the building facing Savile Row, a sign reads "Savile Row W1". On the facade of the building facing Burlington Gardens, it reads "Burlington Gardens W1".

History

1725 to 21st century
The building was first erected in 1725 as a home. In the subsequent years, there were many additions and alterations to the building. At some point, it was made a branch of the Bank of England and staircases and vaults were added in the interior.

Abercrombie & Fitch
Abercrombie & Fitch leased the location in 2005. Overnight in May, a two-story construction wall was erected around the building and was plastered with half-naked men and "Abercrombie & Fitch". The retail space occupies two floors within the building.

Abercrombie & Fitch's presence on Savile Row was initially criticised by the bespoke clothing manufacturers of the street. The Savile Row Bespoke was formed with permission of the City of Westminster to join Row tailors in protecting the image of Savile Row. Mark Henderson, CEO of Gieves & Hawkes was made Chairman and he commented that "Exploiting the Savile Row name to attract high-paying retailers and businesses, at the cost of this world-esteemed industry [Savile Row tailoring], is shortsighted." Another Row tailor, Thomas Mahon, negatively commented on the situation to The Times: "If the Bespoke businesses were driven out by crappy retail stores selling poor-quality clothes...then Savile Row's name would be irreparably damaged."

In 2020, Abercrombie & Fitch announced it was closing its Savile Row store, along with six other global flagship locations, in response to the global pandemic.

Gallery

References

Abercrombie & Fitch
Buildings and structures in Mayfair
Burlington Estate
Henry Paget, 1st Marquess of Anglesey
Grade II* listed buildings in the City of Westminster
Grade II* listed houses in London
Houses completed in 1725
Houses in the City of Westminster